Vanity Fair was a 1956–57 six-part BBC TV serial adaptation of William Makepeace Thackeray's 1848 novel of the same name. The cast included Joyce Redman, Petra Davies, Derek Blomfield, Alan Badel, David Peel, Graham Stuart, Marian Spencer, Jack May. Telerecorded during its live broadcast, only the first episode is known to survive, with the others being junked following a repeat of the telerecordings in 1957.

Cast
Joyce Redman as Becky Sharp
Petra Davies as Amelia Sedley
Derek Blomfield as Captain Dobbin 
Alan Badel as Rawdon Crawley 
Graham Stuart as John Sedley 
Marian Spencer as Mrs. John Sedley
Jack May as Joseph Sedley 
David Peel as George Osborne 
Barbara Leake as Miss Briggs
Lloyd Pearson as Sir Pitt Crawley
Graham Leaman as Gentleman at Stock Exchange
Henry Oscar as Osborne Senior 
Marda Vanne as Miss Crawley
Michael Caridia as George Osborne 
Dorothy Black as Miss Barbara Pinkerton
George Curzon as Lord Steyne
Christopher Steele as Mr. Moss
Katharine Page as Mrs. Bute Crawley
Lockwood West as Pitt Crawley

References

External links
Vanity Fair on IMDb

1956 British television series debuts
1957 British television series endings
Lost BBC episodes
English-language television shows
1950s British drama television series
1950s British television miniseries
Black-and-white British television shows